A dyke march is a lesbian visibility and protest march, much like the original Gay Pride parades and gay rights demonstrations. The main purpose of a dyke march is the encouragement of activism within the lesbian community. Dyke marches commonly take place the Friday or Saturday before LGBT pride parades. Larger metropolitan areas usually have several Pride-related happenings (including picnics, workshops, arts festivals, parties, benefits, dances, and bar events) both before and after the march to further community building; with social outreach to specific segments such as older women, women of color, and lesbian parenting groups.

In North America, dyke marches are now held in the boroughs of Manhattan, Brooklyn, and Queens in New York City; Asbury Park, New Jersey; as well as Atlanta, Boston, Buffalo, Chicago, Long Beach,  Minneapolis,  Oakland, Philadelphia,  Pittsburgh, Portland (Maine), Portland (Oregon), San Diego, San Francisco, Seattle, Washington, DC, and  West Hollywood in the United States; and Calgary, Halifax, Montreal, Ottawa, Toronto, Vancouver, and Winnipeg in Canada. In Europe, dyke marches take place in Berlin and London.

History

Before the concept of a "dyke march" came to be, one of the first documented lesbian pride marches in North America took place in Vancouver, British Columbia, Canada, in May 1981. Approximately 200 lesbians attending the fifth Bi-National Lesbian Conference marched through downtown streets chanting "Look over here, look over there, lesbians are everywhere!"

Later, in October 1981, the now-defunct organization Lesbians Against the Right held a "Dykes in the Streets" march in Toronto, Ontario, with lesbian power, pride, and visibility as the theme. 350 women participated in the demonstration.

The first dyke march was formed in Washington, DC, during the March on Washington for Lesbian, Gay and Bi Equal Rights and Liberation, and held on April 24, 1993. Organized by the Lesbian Avengers, over 20,000 women participated in the march.

Most dyke marches today occur in the month of June during Pride celebrations, which generally transpire around the anniversary of the Stonewall riots in Lower Manhattan on June 28, 1969.

Dyke march events
The reason for the creation of the various dyke marches was to protest what many women saw as the control of Gay Pride events by white gay men at the expense of lesbians in general and women of color in particular.

Europe

Germany

As of 2023, there are dyke marches in more than twenty cities and regions in Germany. The nationwide network of "Dyke* March Germany" is gathering information on all of the dyke marches in Germany on their Instagram account. 

There is a yearly dyke march in Hamburg and since 2014 in Cologne, Germany. Since 2017 also in Heidelberg, and since 2018 in Oldenburg. 

The Berlin Dyke March has been in operation since 2013 in the LGBT-friendly neighborhood of Kreuzberg. The march occurs annually in June, on the day before the Berlin Pride Parade.

As of 2023, there are dyke marches planned in the following locations in Germany throughout the year (in alphabetical order):

- Berlin
- Bielefeld
- Braunschweig
- Bremen
- Erfurt
- Frankfurt
- Göttingen
- Hamburg
- Hannover
- Köln
- Lüneburg
- München 
- Münster
- Nürnberg
- Oldenburg
- Rhein-Neckar
- Ruhrgebiet (three dyke marches each year) 
- Weimar
- Würzburg

United Kingdom
The London Dyke March was first organized in 2012 and is held each year in June. The 2012 march featured speakers, including a representative from the Safra Project, a charity for Muslim LBT women, and Sarah Brown, a transgender lesbian activist and former Lib Dem councilor.

The London Dyke March emphasizes diversity, including bois, queers, femmes, butches, and lipstick lesbians.

North America

United States

Asbury Park, New Jersey
The inaugural Asbury Park Dyke March was held in October 2020.

Chicago

The Chicago Dyke March is held in the month of June and has been in operation since 1995, beginning in the LGBT-friendly neighborhood of Andersonville. Many participants consider it "a chance to celebrate ourselves as women, as lesbians, and to show the community that we are here."

In 2008, organizers of the Chicago Dyke March announced that it would remain in a new location for two consecutive years. The location of the march changed every two to three years to increase visibility throughout all neighborhoods of Chicago. The March was held in Pilsen in 2008 and 2009, in South Shore in 2010 and 2011, in Uptown in 2012 and 2013, in Humboldt Park in 2014, 2015 and 2016, and in La Villita in 2017.

New York

Separate Lesbian pride marches were held in New York City in the 1970s, but they did not become a continuous tradition. The dyke march was renewed by the NY Chapter of the Lesbian Avengers in June 1993, after the success of the Dyke March in Washington. As time passed, many members of the Lesbian Avengers became concerned that New York's Gay Pride March was losing its political edge as it became more accepted by the city and courted by corporations.

On the Saturday before pride, participants gather in Bryant Park as they prepare to march down Fifth Avenue towards Washington Square Park.  The dyke march is open to everyone who identifies as a "dyke".  Because of this, allies and others who do not identify as "dykes" have been asked to stand on the sidewalks and cheer on the marchers. Each year approximately 15,000 women attend this event.

As with the San Francisco Dyke March, the organizers do not seek out a permit, and put emphasis on the political. Even though there are many club nights and parties after the March, the event is not so much about entertainment as it is about highlighting the presence of self-identified women within the LGBT community.

San Francisco

The first San Francisco Dyke March was held in June 1993, and is celebrated every year on the last Saturday in June. The march begins in Mission Dolores Park with speeches, performances, and community networking; and ends in the Castro District. The dyke march is informal, with marchers creating their own signs and most people showing up to participate, rather than to just watch. The San Francisco Dyke March has high attendance numbers.

The streets along the march route are lined with enthusiastic spectators in support of the women. 

In the early years, the San Francisco Dyke March Committee (a small group of volunteers) never applied for nor received a permit from the city, exercising the First Amendment right to gather without permits and often changed its route to avoid the police.

Seattle

Seattle's dyke march occurs the Saturday before Pride and begins with a Rally at 5 pm at Seattle Central Community College, followed by the march through the streets at 7 pm. The rally is held outdoors, includes speakers and performers who are women identified and queer identified, and is ASL interpreted. Since the late 2000s, organizers have filed for a permit. Since about 2007, the march audience has been about 1,000 women, and the permit ensures the streets are clear for marching.

Washington, DC
The DC Dyke March was first organized in April 1993 and thereafter held annually in June until 2007. After a 12-year absence, the march returned in 2019 with "Dykes Against Displacement" as its theme, in protest of the elimination of low-income housing due to gentrification. The march, however, became mired in controversy resulting from the banning of "nationalist symbols".

Incidents regarding Jewish pride flags

2017 Chicago
In 2017, Chicago Dyke March (CDM) organizers singled out three women carrying Jewish pride flags and began questioning them on their political stance in regards to Zionism and Israel. After a discussion, organizers asked them to leave the event, insisting that the rainbow flag with the Star of David "made people feel unsafe" and that the dyke march was "pro-Palestinian and anti-Zionist".  The incident prompted widespread criticism and accusations of anti-Semitism. A member of the Dyke March Chicago collective stated that the women were removed due to the flags, and pro-Palestinian organizations were asked by CDM to release statements of solidarity while they crafted an official statement. March organizers later released a statement maintaining that the women were asked to leave due to their "Zionist stance and support for Israel", and not the use of Jewish symbols.

In 2018, members of the local Jewish LGBT community expressed reluctance to attend that year's march, citing concerns about safety and alienation.

In 2021, an Instagram post from the CDM organizers included the American and Israeli flags burning.  The post was later deleted and replaced with a new image that shrouded both flags in flames.

2019 Washington, DC
Similar to the 2017 decision made by the Chicago Dyke March, the 2019 Washington DC Dyke March adopted a policy that "nationalist symbols", including Israeli and American flags and the Star of David when centered on a flag, cannot be displayed. Organizers said these symbols represent "violent nationalism", and said those attending the event should "not bring pro-Israel paraphernalia in solidarity with our queer Palestinian friends", while "Jewish stars and other identifications and celebrations of Jewishness (yarmulkes, talit, other expressions of Judaism or Jewishness) are welcome and encouraged". Palestinian flags and symbols were permitted.

In response to the policy, Anti-Defamation League CEO Jonathan Greenblatt stated, "It is outrageous that in preparing to celebrate LGBTQ pride, the DC Dyke March is forbidding Jewish participants from carrying any flag or sign that includes the Star of David, which is universally recognized as a symbol of the Jewish people....Banning the Star of David in their parade is anti-Semitic, plain and simple." A coalition of progressive Jewish-American groups denounced the ban in a joint statement, and the National LGBTQ Task Force withdrew their support for the DC Dyke March.

More than two dozen Jewish lesbians and Zionist supporters brought the prohibited flag and symbol to the march. They debated the perceived mistreatment and exclusion with march organizer Jill Raney. Thereafter, DC Dyke March organizers allowed the group to participate in the march with their Jewish pride flags.

Gallery of dyke marches

See also

List of LGBT events
List of LGBT awareness periods
Trans March

References

Further reading

Chicago

New York City

Portland

San Francisco

Toronto

Vancouver

External links

Dyke March groups

United States
  Boston Dyke March
  New York City Dyke March
  San Francisco Dyke March
  Seattle Dyke March

Canada
  Vancouver Dyke March

Germany
  Berlin Dyke March
 Heidelberg Dyke March
 Köln (Cologne) Dyke March
 München (Munich) Dyke March
 Nürnberg Dyke March
 Oldenburg Dyke March

Feminist protests
Lesbian culture
Lesbian events
Lesbian feminism
LGBT civil rights demonstrations
Pride parades
Protest marches
Women's marches
Anti-Zionism in the United States
Flag controversies in the United States
Articles containing video clips